A microvan is a van or minivan which is within the Japanese kei car classification or similar, and is smaller than a mini MPV. In China, these vehicles are nicknamed mian bao che ("bread-loaf vehicle") because of their shape. Similarly, in several Hispanic American countries, these vehicles are called pan de molde, which means "bread loaf". In Indonesia, it is commonly called a minibus due to their tall roof, perceived as resembling a miniature bus; the term is also used generally to refer to any type of three-row MPVs.

Outside of China and Japan, microvans are also common in Southeast Asia, South Asia, Africa, Latin America, and the Middle East. Microvans share similar characteristics with other-sized MPVs; for instance, microvans commonly have rear sliding doors. Generally, they have capacity for six, seven, or eight passengers. As this category of vehicle has fixed third-row seats, a single vehicle cannot be used both for passenger transport and larger-cargo transport without refitting; therefore, microvans are not usually considered multi-purpose vehicles.

Economics
Tax and insurance benefits in some locations make these models particularly inexpensive. For example, in rural Japan, kei-car vehicles are exempted from a certification that adequate parking is available for the vehicle. They are, therefore, widely used for small businesses in these places.

Design
The first vehicle to adopt the bodystyle of a van, with the engine installed in front of the driver, was the 1970s Honda Life "StepVan". Some microvans use a drivetrain with the engine installed transversely, using front- or all-wheel drive, while others use a cabover approach where the engine is installed beneath the driver, while still using all-wheel or rear-wheel drive powertrains. Cabover variants usually share their chassis with kei truck derivatives from the same manufacturer.

Most microvans have two swinging front doors, two sliding rear doors and a large tailgate. Seating can vary from two to nine; these seats are usually very thin and vertical to optimise room. The side windows in commercial-only versions of microvans are replaced by metallic panels; this type of microvan is sometimes called a "blind van". Some models also feature pick-up variants with one or two seat rows. Engines usually have displacements under 1.0 L; for example, Japanese microvans have a limit of 660 cc. Outside the Japanese market,  microvans are available with 850-cc to 1.6-L engines.

The kei car regulation is used only in Japan, though other Asian automakers also design microvans with similar characteristics. The microvans are commonly known as "kei one-box" in Japan; their pick-up versions are known as kei trucks.

Safety
Due to their inherent compact size, lack of crumple zones, and low weight, these vehicles tend to fare poorly in collisions with other vehicles and objects, so are not recommended to be driven at higher speeds. The Insurance Institute for Highway Safety in the United States recommends these vehicles only be driven on private land and not on public roads due to their poor safety in accidents.

Gallery

Kei microvans

Non-kei microvans

See also
 Compact van
 Panel van

References

External links 

 Micro Van Owners Web Site/Forum

 
Cab over vehicles
Commercial vehicles